Peter Fragiskatos  (born April 30, 1981) is a Canadian academic and Liberal Party of Canada politician, who was first elected to represent the riding of London North Centre in the House of Commons of Canada in the 2015 federal election.

Fragiskatos' family is of Greek descent. His grandmother Panagiota emigrated from Greece following World War II, and later became an organizer for the New Democratic Party's leaders Tommy Douglas and Stephen Lewis. Fragiskatos later attributed his interest in politics and social justice to her. He attended the University of Western Ontario (where he earned a Bachelor of Arts), Queen's University (Master of Arts), and finally the University of Cambridge (PhD), where his focus was on Kurdish human rights issues.

On October 21, 2019, MP Fragiskatos was re-elected by the residents of London North Centre during the 2019 federal election.
 
Since first being elected in 2015, Fragiskatos has held several key committee appointments, which include: Foreign Affairs and International Development (January 29, 2016 – September 18, 2017), Public Safety and National Security (September 18, 2017 – September 19, 2018), Subcommittee on International Human Rights of the Standing Committee on Foreign Affairs and International Development (January 31, 2017 – September 11, 2019), Finance (September 19, 2018 – September 11, 2019, January 27 – August 18, 2020, October 6, 2020 – August 15, 2021), Canada–China Relations (January 15 – August 18, 2020, October 6, 2020 – August 15, 2021) and Public Accounts (December 9, 2021 – Present).

On June 15, 2021, Justin Trudeau, the Prime Minister of Canada, appointed MP Fragiskatos to the National Security and Intelligence Committee of Parliamentarians after he secured a top secret security clearance, a requirement for the role. As stated in the release announcing the appointment, the Honourable David J. McGuinty has chaired this committee since its launch in 2017, and includes representatives from both the House of Commons and the Senate. It provides a non-partisan approach to the review of national security and intelligence activities carried out across the Government of Canada. The committee was first created under the National Security and Intelligence Committee of Parliamentarians Act, which received Royal Assent on June 22, 2017.

The 2021 federal election, held that September 20, saw Fragiskatos re-elected to a third term by the voters in London North Centre. Shortly thereafter, on December 3, 2021, Prime Minister Trudeau appointed MP Fragiskatos as the Parliamentary Secretary to the Minister of National Revenue.

Prior to his election, Fragiskatos was a political science professor at Huron University College and King's University College at the University of Western Ontario. He was a frequent commentator on international issues, and was published by Maclean's, The Globe and Mail, The Toronto Star, BBC News, and CNN.

Fragiskatos lives in the riding of London North Centre with his wife, Katy, and his daughter, Ava.

Electoral record

References

External links
 Official Website

1981 births
Living people
Liberal Party of Canada MPs
Alumni of the University of Cambridge
Members of the House of Commons of Canada from Ontario
Politicians from London, Ontario
Canadian people of Greek descent
Canadian political scientists
Queen's University at Kingston alumni
University of Western Ontario alumni
21st-century Canadian politicians